Sore (pronounced , often stylized as SORE) is an Indonesian indie band formed in Jakarta in 2002. The band was originally formed by Ade Paloh, Mondo Gascaro and Awan Garnida. They have been close friends since childhood. Other two members, Bemby Gusti and Reza Dwiputranto, were brought in by Awan Garnida.

History

2004—2005: Early years and Centralismo debut album
In 2004 and early 2005, Sore contributed two songs in a couple of compilation albums. The first one was in a compilation album of Jakarta’s indie scene called JKRT: SKRG (an abbreviation of "Jakarta, Sekarang" which translates to "Jakarta, Now"). The album was released by Aksara Records. Another one was an original motion picture soundtrack of Janji Joni. The album was also released by Aksara Records.

SORE finally released their full-length debut album Centralismo in 2005. The album title itself refer to the word "central", which in this case refer to Central Jakarta, where the most band members grew up. The music varied greatly from track to track as each member contributed lead singing and song-writing in this album. Their vintage instrumentation, like the use of vibraphones, mellotron, and horn section is reminiscent of popular music in the 1950s, 1960s, and 1970s.

The first album was praised by Time Magazine Asia as "One of Five Asian Albums Worth Buying", and Rolling Stone Indonesia magazine ranked it the 40th in "150 Greatest Indonesian Albums of All Time". The fifth single, "No Fruits for Today", also ranked as one of 150 Greatest Indonesian Albums of All Time.

2005—2008: Ports of Lima
While preparing their materials for their second album, they contributed to four original soundtrack albums: Berbagi Suami (Love for Share); Kala (Dead Time); the Joko Anwar film Quickie Express; Perempuan Punya Cerita (Chants of Lotus), one of which became a hit single, "Pergi Tanpa Pesan", a reworking of an Indonesian classic from the late 1950s.

In April 2008, three years after releasing the debut album, SORE released their second album, Ports of Lima produced by the Aksara Records label. The album was also voted as "Best Album of 2008 in the #1st list rank number" by Rolling Stone Indonesia magazine.

Discography

Studio albums
 2005: Centralismo
 2008: Ports of Lima
 2015: Los Skut Leboys

EPs
 2010: Sombreros Kiddos
 2019: Mevrouw

Compilations
 2013 : Sorealist

Singles
 2004: "Cermin" - from album JKT:SKRG (V.A. Compilation)
 2005: "Funk the Hole" - Janji Joni (O.S.T Movie Compilation)
 2006: "Pergi Tanpa Pesan" - Berbagi Suami (O.S.T Movie Compilation)
 2006: "No Fruits for Today" - Berbagi Suami (O.S.T Movie Compilation)
 2007: "Hidup Itu Indah" - Mesin Waktu: Teman-Teman Menyanyikan Lagu Naif (V.A. Tribute Album)
 2007: "Ada Musik Di Dalam" - Kala (O.S.T Movie Compilation)
 2007: "Ernestito" - Quickie Express (O.S.T Movie Compilation)
 2009: "The Hitman" - from album Synchronize Session One (V.A. Compilation)
 2009: "Nancy Bird" - Forbidden Door (O.S.T Movie Compilation)
 2009: "Lullaby Blues" - Forbidden Door (O.S.T Movie Compilation)

Personnel

Current members 
 Ade Firza Paloh - guitar, vocals (2002–present)
 Awan Garnida - bass, vocals (2002–present)
 Bemby Gusti Pramudya - drums, vocals (2002–present)

Former members 

 Ramondo Gascaro - piano, keyboard, guitar, vocals (2002–2012)
 Reza Dwi Putranto - guitar, vocals (2002–2019)
 Dono Firman - synthesizer, guitar (2008–2013)

See also
 List of Indonesian rock bands
 List of Indonesian musicians

References

External links
 SORE Myspace
 SORE Twitter
 SORE Fanpage on Facebook
 SORE on Reverbnation
 SORE on Instagram

Indonesian rock music groups
Musical collectives
Anugerah Musik Indonesia winners